Operation Iron Fist may refer to:

Operation Iron Fist (2002), an operation in Sudan
Operation Iron Fist II (2004) from the list of coalition military operations of the Iraq War
Operation Iron Fist (2005), an operation in the Iraq War
Operation Iron Fist, a code name for 2020 Nagorno-Karabakh war

See also
Iron Fist (disambiguation)

Code names